"By a Waterfall" is a 1933 song with music by Sammy Fain and lyrics by Irving Kahal. It was featured in an extravagant choreographic arrangement in the film Footlight Parade by Busby Berkeley that features his trademark human waterfall, with vocal performances by Dick Powell and Ruby Keeler. It features a water ballet of chorus girls diving and swimming into the water in elaborate geometric and floral patterns.

The lyrics of the song use the phrase "I'm calling you - oo-oo-oo" in much the same way as the Indian Love Call from the operetta Rose-Marie.

Berkeley realized that screen choreography involved the placement and movement of the camera as well as the dancers. Instead of filming numbers from fixed angles, he set his cameras into motion on custom built booms and monorails and if necessary, cut through the studio roof to get the right shot.

Berkeley used a 40 x 80 foot (12.2 x 24.4 meter) swimming pool that filled an entire soundstage. Its walls and floor were glass, and before shooting started 100 chorus girls took two weeks to practice their routines in it.  The actual filming lasted six days and required 20,000 gallons (75,708 liters) of water a minute to be pumped across the set.

Recordings
The recordings by Guy Lombardo & His Royal Canadians (vocal by Carmen Lombardo), Leo Reisman & His Orchestra (vocal by Arthur Wright) and by Rudy Vallee are assessed by Joel Whitburn as the most popular in 1933.

Other recordings

Chick Bullock's Levee Loungers recorded the song for Oriole Records (catalog No. 2780A) on October 30, 1933. 
Dick Powell recorded the song for Brunswick Records (catalog No. 6667) on September 27, 1933.
Ozzie Nelson and his Orchestra recorded the song for Vocalion Records (catalog No. 2547) on September 5, 1933.

In popular culture 
Welcome Back, Kotter: On a season one episode, Horshack gets up in front of the class and sings this song. Barbarino and Washington also join in.
Diff'rent Strokes: In a season one episode, Mrs. Garret sings this song about Arnold.
 In animated shorts such as How Do I Know It's Sunday (1934), September in the Rain (1937), Goofy Groceries (1941), The Pest That Came To Dinner (1948), and Dr. Devil and Mr. Hare (1964), both from the Merrie Melodies series but the one Looney Tunes series, the song is often used to punctuate jokes, as in the shorts when it is literally sung by a waterfall. 
 The British Comedy/satire band the Bonzo Dog (Doo Dah) Band also covered this song, recording it on their third album "Tadpoles" released in 1969, and also performing it earlier on a UK television show called "Do Not Adjust Your Set".
 The song could be heard accompanying a recreation of the waterfall sequence of Footlight Parade in Disney's The Great Movie Ride before its closure in 2017.
 In the novel The Swimming-Pool Library by Alan Hollinghurst, protagonist Will describes how a 'hard-on might pass from one end of the room to the other with the foolish perfection of a Busby Berkeley routine', evoking this choreography.

References 

1933 songs
Songs with music by Sammy Fain
Songs with lyrics by Irving Kahal
Bonzo Dog Doo-Dah Band songs
Guy Lombardo songs